Ludvik Ashkenazy (24 February 1921 in Český Těšín, Czechoslovakia – 18 March 1986 in Bolzano, Italy) was a Czech writer and journalist. He was born into a Jewish family in Stanisławów, then part of the Second Republic of Poland, now present-day Ivano-Frankivsk, Ukraine (also the site of the Stanisławów Ghetto).

He studied Slavonic philology in Lviv, which was then part of Poland.

During World War II, he was a soldier in the Czech units of the Soviet Army in the Soviet Union. He was a member of the Communist Party of Czechoslovakia. Between 1945 and 1950 he worked in the state Czechoslovak Radio and after that, he became a government-sanctioned "writer."

After the Soviet invasion of Czechoslovakia in 1968, he left for exile and until 1976 lived in Munich. Between 1976 and 1986, he lived in the Italian town of Bolzano with his wife, Leonie Mann, daughter of the German writer Heinrich Mann. He had two sons, Jindřich Mann, also a writer, and Ludwik Mann, who illustrated a number of his books.

He won the Deutscher Jugendliteraturpreis in 1977 for his book Wo die Füchse Blockflöte spielen, and was shortlisted for the same prize in 1993 for Der Schlittschuhkarpfen.

He is celebrated in an annual festival in the town of Český Těšín, Czech Republic.

See also

 List of Czech writers

List of publications (partial) 

 Wo die Füchse Blockflöte spielen (1977)
 Der Schlittschuhkarpfen (1981)
 Du bist einmalig
 Blaubart und die Elefanten (1983)

Filmography 

 1953: Můj přítel Fabian (German title: Mein Freund Fabian) – Director: Jiří Weiss
 1957: Tam na konečné (German title: An der Endstation)  – Director: Ján Kadár, Elmar Klos
 1959: Májové hvězdy (German title: Sterne im Mai)  – Director: Stanislav Rostotsky
 1964: Křik (German title: Der Schrei) – Director: Jaromil Jireš (Screenplay)
 1974: Tatort – 3:0 for Veigl (Actor)

Translations into English 
 Ашкенази Л. Чёрная шкатулка (зонги, баллады и истории). Перевёл с чешского на русский и английский Александр Лейзерович. Ashkenazy L. A Little Black Casket (songs, ballads, and tales). Translated from Czech into Russian and English by Alexander Leyzerovich. – Sunnyvale, CA: All Digital Club, 2002. – 140 p.

References

External links
  List of works from the Czech National Library

1921 births
1986 deaths
Writers from Ivano-Frankivsk
People from Stanisławów Voivodeship
Czech Jews
Communist Party of Czechoslovakia members
Czech journalists
20th-century Czech dramatists and playwrights
Czech male dramatists and playwrights
Czechoslovak expatriates in Italy
20th-century journalists
Polish emigrants to Czechoslovakia
Czechoslovak expatriates in Germany